Sergio Cirio Olivares (born 9 March 1985) is a Spanish former footballer who played as a striker or left winger, currently manager of UD Ibiza B.

Club career
Born in Barcelona, Catalonia, Cirio had a six-year youth spell at FC Barcelona's La Masia, but spent his senior career in Spain in the lower leagues, mainly Segunda División B. He started out with CF Badalona, before moving to CE Europa for the 2006–07 season.

In the 2007–08 campaign, Cirio played for Atromitos F.C. in Greece. He scored his first goal in the Super League on 2 September 2007 in a 2–1 home victory over Levadiakos FC, as his team were eventually relegated as 14th.

After spells with Orihuela CF, AE Prat and CE L'Hospitalet Cirio signed a two-year contract with Adelaide United FC of the A-League on 8 July 2013. He scored his first goal for the club on 18 October, a penalty in a 2–2 draw against Melbourne Victory FC. His first hat-trick in Australia came on 23 February 2014, in a 4–3 away loss to the same opposition.

In July 2017, after 20 goals and seven assists in four seasons, the 32-year-old Cirio returned to Spain and joined amateurs UD Ibiza. He netted 30 times in his first year (play-offs included), and they reached the third tier for the first time ever.

Cirio won another first-ever promotion at the end of 2020–21, now to Segunda División; he was by now only a fringe player due to an Achilles tendon injury. He retired before he had a chance to play professional football in his country, and started working with Ibiza's youth sides.

Club statistics

Honours
Adelaide United
A-League Championship: 2016
A-League Premiership: 2015–16
FFA Cup: 2014

Individual
FFA Cup top scorer: 2014 (6 goals)
Mark Viduka Medal: 2014
Aurelio Vidmar club champion: 2014–15
Golden Boots: 2014–15

References

External links

1985 births
Living people
Spanish footballers
Footballers from Barcelona
Association football wingers
Association football forwards
Segunda División B players
Tercera División players
CF Badalona players
RCD Mallorca B players
CE Europa footballers
Orihuela CF players
AE Prat players
CE L'Hospitalet players
UD Ibiza players
Super League Greece players
Atromitos F.C. players
A-League Men players
Adelaide United FC players
Spanish expatriate footballers
Expatriate footballers in Greece
Expatriate soccer players in Australia
Spanish expatriate sportspeople in Greece
Spanish expatriate sportspeople in Australia
Spanish football managers